In bridge, the Deschapelles coup is the lead of an unsupported honor to create an entry in partner's hand; often confused with the Merrimac coup, the lead of an unsupported honor to kill an entry in an opponent's hand.

This sacrificial play was invented by Alexandre Deschapelles, a 19th-century French chess and whist player ,

Example

Geir Helgemo executed this Deschapelles Coup in a 1998 tournament.
 Helgemo was East against South's 4. West led a small spade, Helgemo put up the Q and South won the A. South then returned a spade to Helgamo's K. Helgemo cashed the A and switched to the K (the coup). Dummy won the A and played the Q to the K, A and J.

Now declarer tried to enter dummy with the K, but Helgemo ruffed, put West in with the Q, and ruffed the club return for down two.

It would not have helped South to duck the K because Helgemo would simply have continued hearts, winding up with a trick in each suit.

And it would not have helped Helgemo to switch to a low heart at trick four. South wins West's Q with the A, leads the Q, covered and won, and then leads another heart to endplay Helgemo.

This is a particularly unusual Deschapelles coup, because it is combined with a Merrimac coup. The same play of the K both establishes an entry for West and takes out an entry to dummy.

References

External links
BridgeGuys

Contract bridge coups